The 2010–11 season was the inaugural season in the history of Melbourne Heart FC since its establishment in 2009. The team played in the A-League for the first time with all of their home matches being played at AAMI Park. After being placed sixth for the better part of the season, the team would go on to finish eighth on the ladder.

Former Australian international John Aloisi was the Heart's top goalscorer, with eight goals, in his final season in professional football.

Players

Injury replacement

*Note: Both Behich and Zahra signed long-term deals at the completion of their replacement deal period.

Transfers in

Transfers out

Statistics

Squad statistics

Discipline

Goal scorers

Pre-season and friendlies

Competitions

A-League

League table

Matches

References

External links
 Official website

2010-11
2010–11 A-League season by team